Hamidiyeh ( also Romanized as Ḩamīdīyeh; also known as Allāh, Illah, and Hamidiya) is a city and capital of Hamidiyeh District, in Ahvaz County, Khuzestan Province, Iran.  At the 2006 census, its population was 21,977, in 3,949 families.

References

Populated places in Ahvaz County

Cities in Khuzestan Province